Travel in April is a 1962 Soviet comedy film directed by Vadim Derbenyov.

Plot 
A student journalist goes down the river to Nizhny Lazuren, where he is expected, but he ended up in the fabulous Upper Lazuren, where he met a beautiful woman named Maria, because of whom he stayed there.

Cast 
 Rolan Bykov
 Dumitru Fusu
 Valentina Izbeschuk
 Konstantin Konstantinov
 Rayisa Nedashkivs'ka
 Ion Ungureanu
 Aleksandr Zbruyev

References

External links 
 

1962 films
1960s Russian-language films
Soviet comedy films
1962 comedy films